Pedobacter heparinus (P. heparinus) is non-spore-forming, Gram-negative bacterium that can use carbohydrates as its sole nutrient source.

References

External links
Type strain of Pedobacter heparinus at BacDive -  the Bacterial Diversity Metadatabase

Sphingobacteriia
Bacteria described in 1998